Guilden is part of the name of the following places in England:

Guilden Morden, village and civil parish in Cambridgeshire
See also Guilden Morden boar, Anglo-Saxon bronze figurine
Guilden Sutton, village and civil parish in Cheshire